Reijo Aukusti Enävaara (3 April 1938, Helsinki – 6 August 1984) was a Finnish journalist and politician. He served as a Member of the Parliament of Finland from 1983 until his death in 1984, representing the Finnish Rural Party (SMP).

References

1938 births
1984 deaths
Politicians from Helsinki
Finnish Rural Party politicians
Members of the Parliament of Finland (1983–87)
Place of death missing
20th-century Finnish journalists